Selenoyl fluoride, selenoyl difluoride, selenium oxyfluoride, or selenium dioxydifluoride is a chemical compound with the formula SeO2F2.

Structure

The shape of the molecule is a distorted tetrahedron with the O-Se-O angle being 126.2°, the O-Se-F angle being 108.0° and F-Se-F being 94.1°.  The Se-F bond length is 1.685 Å and the selenium to oxygen bond is 1.575 Å long.

Formation
Selenoyl fluoride can be formed by the action of warm fluorosulfonic acid on barium selenate or selenic acid. SeO3 + SeF4 can give this gas along with other oxyfluorides.

Reactions
Selenoyl fluoride is more reactive than its analogon sulfuryl fluoride. It is easier to hydrolyse and to reduce. It may react violently upon contact with ammonia.

Selenoyl fluoride reacting with xenon difluoride gives FXeOSeF5.

References

Selenium(VI) compounds
Oxyfluorides
Gases